Oxford Friend was an Oxford based LGBTQ+ charity which provided emotional support and counselling to the lesbian, gay, bisexual, and transgender community of the city of Oxford and the county of Oxfordshire. The original volunteers were part of the local branch of the Campaign for Homosexual Equality (CHE). Listening services were provided by telephone, email, Facebook and instant messaging. The charity also provided training on LGBTQ+ issues for educational institutions and other organisations in and around Oxfordshire. Oxford Friend raised money via a grant from Oxford City Council (as it was part of their campaign to support the local LGBTQ+ community), donations, and external training packages.

The group was established in 1980 and was registered as a charity in 1988. In 2006, the group was awarded the Queen's Award for Voluntary Service. Oxford Friend officially closed on 31 March 2020.

See also

Facebook page 
Twitter page
Website
Brighton Gay and Lesbian Switchboard
Gay & Lesbian Switchboard of New York
London Friend
Switchboard (UK)

References

LGBT organisations in England
Charities based in Oxfordshire
1980 establishments in the United Kingdom
Crisis hotlines